Zeroual is a surname. Notable people with the surname include:

Abdellatif Zeroual (1951–1974), Moroccan politician and philosopher
Bouchaib Zeroual, Moroccan sport shooter
Karim Zeroual, English presenter for CBBC
Liamine Zéroual (born 1941), Algerian general, politician and President of Algeria
Soria Zeroual (born 1970), Algerian actress